The  was the first defeat suffered by Takeda Shingen, and the first field battle in Japan in which firearms were used. It took place in Shinano Province or the modern-day Nagano Prefecture.

Battle 
The Battle of Uedahara was part of Shingen's attempt to control Shinano Province. Shingen's father had invaded the territory and the clan was already in control of the bulk of its southern region around Lake Suwa. Shingen's campaign began with the takeover of Shika castle, which alarmed Murakami Yoshikiyo due to its proximity to his territories. The latter sent an army tasked with aiding Shika but it was ambushed by Shingen's troops at Odaihara. Yoshikiyo began mobilizing his forces in March 1548 to capture Shiga and drive Shingen out of Shinano.

Takeda Shingen met up with his force that had taken Shika castle, and led 7000 men north to face the threat posed by Yoshikiyo. Shingen's vanguard was led by Itagaki Nobukata; when they charged head-on into Murakami's vanguard, the charge was absorbed, and Itagaki was killed.

Murakami made use of 50 ashigaru armed with Japanese "hand cannon" arquebuses, who were meant to serve as support for archers. The army also used short-barreled Chinese handguns to counter the enemy's cavalry. Shingen, on the other hand, adhered to the traditional battle strategy and failed to use the tanegashima first. Around 700 of Takeda's men were killed, including Itagaki, and two other generals, Amari Torayasu and Hajikano Den'emon. Shingen himself even suffered a spear wound to his left arm.

Aftermath 
Despite Murakami's victory, his power was significantly diminished after the battle of Uedahara. This was attributed to the death of his top-ranking samurai, crippling his capability to stand up on his own. On the other hand, Shingen benefited from the conflict, expanding his power further as he gained the Kousaka, Inoue, Mennai, Suda, Takanashi, and Seba districts.

References

Turnbull, Stephen (1998). The Samurai Sourcebook. London: Cassell & Co.

Uedahara
1548 in Japan
Uedahara